Inman is a city in Spartanburg County, South Carolina, United States. The population was 3,665 at the 2020 census, and 2,321 at the 2010 census.

Greater Inman is close to the Spartanburg-Greenville-Anderson metroplex. Inman residents have access to nearby Lake Bowen that affords water recreational sports and fishing, and Inman is accessible by Interstate 26 and Interstate 85. The city contains a historic main street district, several houses of worship, and a school district.

History
The Bush House and Shiloh Methodist Church are listed on the National Register of Historic Places.

Geography
Inman is located at  (35.047493, -82.090329).  The city lies just north of Spartanburg, and a few miles south of the North Carolina-South Carolina border.

The city's historic district lies along South Carolina Highway 292 just north of its intersection with U.S. Route 176 (which passes along the southwestern edge of the city). SC 292 also connects Inman with Interstate 26 to the east.  Inman Mills, an unincorporated community, lies immediately southwest of Inman.

Climate

Inman is located in the Upstate region of South Carolina. The weather is temperate year-round, due to its location in the Isothermal Belt, a phenomenon that results when warmer air on the western side of the Appalachian Mountains blows over the mountains, leaving a  trough where significant temperature inversions of 20 degrees Fahrenheit or greater can occur.

Demographics

2020 census

As of the 2020 United States census, there were 2,990 people, 1,141 households, and 604 families residing in the city.

2000 census
As of the census of 2000, there were 1,884 people, 750 households, and 486 families residing in the city. The population density was 2,015.8 people per square mile (782.2/km2). There were 829 housing units at an average density of 887.0 per square mile (344.2/km2). The racial makeup of the city was 69.27% White, 27.76% African American, 0.16% Native American, 1.38% Asian, 0.74% from other races, and 0.69% from two or more races. Hispanic or Latino of any race were 1.27% of the population.

There were 750 households, out of which 29.7% had children under the age of 18 living with them, 42.1% were married couples living together, 19.5% had a female householder with no husband present, and 35.2% were non-families. 31.7% of all households were made up of individuals, and 16.5% had someone living alone who was 65 years of age or older. The average household size was 2.39 and the average family size was 3.03.

In the city, the population was spread out, with 25.0% under the age of 18, 7.3% from 18 to 24, 27.8% from 25 to 44, 19.3% from 45 to 64, and 20.6% who were 65 years of age or older. The median age was 38 years. For every 100 females, there were 79.4 males. For every 100 females age 18 and over, there were 72.9 males.

The median income for a household in the city was $40,403, and the median income for a family was $50,298. Males had a median income of $37,177 versus $30,399 for females. The per capita income for the city was $35,416. About 8.0% of families and 12.5% of the population were below the poverty line, including 10.7% of those under age 18 and 19.4% of those age 65 or over.

Education
Inman has a lending library, a branch of the Spartanburg County Public Library.

Notable people
Fieldin Culbreth, MLB umpire
Heath Hembree, MLB Pitcher
James Hylton, NASCAR driver
Deebo Samuel, NFL Wide Receiver
Lonnie Smith, MLB All Star, 3x World Series champion

References

External links

 City of Inman official website
 Greater Inman Area Chamber of Commerce

Cities in South Carolina
Cities in Spartanburg County, South Carolina